Amen Corner is a 2007 novel by American author Rick Shefchik, published March 9 by Poisoned Pen Press. A mystery/thriller set at the Masters Tournament of golf, it centers on Minneapolis police detective and amateur golfer Sam Skarda, as he competes in his first Masters and tries to stop a crazed killer determined to put an end to the tournament. It is the first in a series about Skarda and his adventures investigating crime in the sports world. The second, Green Monster, was published August 1, 2008.

Reviews
Bill Ott of Booklist said of the novel “Shefchik…takes his share of shots at the green-jacketed elite who run the Masters, but he makes a game attempt at realism, both in his portrayal of the tournament itself and in his premise: a Minneapolis cop, on medical leave, wins the U.S. Publinx Championship and qualifies for the Masters… Shefchik combines a surprisingly grisly plot and a convincing villain with plenty of more or less realistic golf action … this one makes the cut. Entertaining …”

Susan Pettrone of Reader Views said “I found myself thoroughly enjoying every moment of this book. The sharp character of Sam, the smarts of Caroline and the cool determination of the killer, all make for an extremely entertaining read … I would highly recommend ‘Amen Corner’ for anyone with a love of golf as it is not only a mystery but a look behind the scenes of the Masters … from start to finish … a winner in every sense of the word…a great read and an engaging story all wrapped up in one.”

Marx Swanholm of the Minneapolis Star Tribune called Amen Corner "an entertaining novel, full of inside details on America's closely guarded cathedral of golf."

External links 
 Rick Shefchik Official Website
 Poisoned Pen Press

2007 American novels
American crime novels

Novels about golf
Masters Tournament
Novels set in Georgia (U.S. state)
Poisoned Pen Press books